Household air pollution (HAP) is a significant form of indoor air pollution mostly relating to cooking and heating methods used in developing countries. Since much of the cooking is carried out with biomass fuel, in the form of wood, charcoal, dung, and crop residue, in indoor environments that lack proper ventilation, millions of people, primarily women and children face serious health risks. In total, about three billion people in developing countries are affected by this problem. The World Health Organization (WHO) estimates that cooking-related pollution causes 3.8 million annual deaths. The Global Burden of Disease study estimated the number of deaths in 2017 at 1.6 million. The problem is closely related to Energy poverty and cooking.

Smoke from traditional household solid fuel combustion commonly contains a range of incomplete combustion products, including both fine and coarse particulate matter (e.g., PM2.5, PM10), carbon monoxide (CO), nitrogen dioxide (NO2), sulfur dioxide (SO2), and a variety of organic air pollutants.

Technology-based solutions to this problem tend to focus on the supply of improved cookstoves although behavioral changes can also be important.

Problem description and scale 

Three billion people in developing countries rely on biomass fuel, in the form of wood, charcoal, dung, and crop residue, as their domestic cooking and heating fuel. Since much of the cooking is carried out indoors in environments that lack proper ventilation, millions of people, primarily women and children face serious health risks. The major sources of indoor pollution include combustion and building materials. Globally, 4.3 million deaths were attributed to exposure to IAP in developing countries in 2012, almost all in low and middle-income countries. The South East Asian and Western Pacific regions bear most of the burden with 1.69 and 1.62 million deaths, respectively. Almost 600,000 deaths occur in Africa, 200,000 in the Eastern Mediterranean region, 99,000 in Europe and 81,000 in the Americas. The remaining 19,000 deaths occur in high-income countries.

Even though the rate of dependence on biomass fuel is declining, this dwindling resource will not keep up with population growth which could ultimately put environments at even greater risk.

Over the past several decades, there have been numerous studies investigating the air pollution generated by traditional household solid fuel combustion for space heating, lighting, and cooking in developing countries. It is now well established that, throughout much of the developing world, indoor burning of solid fuels (biomass, coal, etc.) by inefficient, often insufficiently vented, combustion devices results in elevated exposure to household air pollutants. This is due to the poor combustion efficiency of the combustion devices and the elevated nature of the emissions. In addition, they are often released directly into living areas. Smoke from traditional household solid fuel combustion commonly contains a range of incomplete combustion products, including both fine and coarse particulate matter (e.g., PM2.5, PM10), carbon monoxide (CO), nitrogen dioxide (NO2), sulfur dioxide (SO2), and a variety of organic air pollutants (e.g., formaldehyde, 1,3-butadiene, benzene, acetaldehyde, acrolein, phenols, pyrene, benzopyrene, benzo(a)pyrene, dibenzopyrenes, dibenzocarbazoles, and cresols). In a typical solid fuel stove, about 6–20% of the solid fuel is converted into toxic emissions (by mass). The exact quantity and relative composition is determined by factors such as the fuel type and moisture content, stove type and operation influencing the amount.

In January 2023, ways of improving indoor air pollution when using a gas stove, linked to an increased risk of asthma and other possible illnesses, was published in The New York Times.

Health impacts

Most measurements have been focused on breathing-zone exposure levels of particulate matter (PM) and carbon monoxide (CO), which are the main products of incomplete combustion and are considered to pose the greatest health risks. Indoor PM2.5 exposure levels have been consistently reported to be in the range of hundreds to thousands of micrograms per cubic meter (μg/m3). Similarly, CO exposure levels have been measured to be as high as hundreds to greater than 1000 milligrams per cubic meter (mg/m3). A recent study of 163 households in two rural Chinese counties reported geometric mean indoor PM2.5 concentrations of 276 μg/m3 (combinations of different plant materials, including wood, tobacco stems, and corncobs), 327 μg/m3 (wood), 144 μg/m3 (smoky coal), and 96 μg/m3 (smokeless coal) for homes using a variety of different fuel types and stove configurations (e.g., vented, unvented, portable, fire pit, mixed ventilation stove).

Rural Kenya has been the site of various applied research projects to determine the intensity of emissions that commonly occur from use of biomass fuels, particularly wood, dung, and crop residue. Smoke is the result of the incomplete combustion of solid fuel which women and children are exposed to up to seven hours each day in closed environments.
These emissions vary from day to day, season to season and with changes in the amount of airflow within the residence. Exposure in poor homes far exceeds accepted safety levels by as much as one hundred times over. Because many Kenyan women utilize a three-stone fire, the worst offender, one kilogram of burning wood produces tiny particles of soot which can clog and irritate the bronchial pathways. The smoke also contains various poisonous gases such as aldehydes, benzene, and carbon monoxide. Exposure to IAP from the combustion of solid fuels has been implicated, with varying degrees of evidence, as a causal agent of several diseases. Acute lower respiratory infections (ALRI) and chronic obstructive pulmonary disease (COPD) are the leading causes of disease and death from exposure to smoke. Cataracts and blindness, lung cancer, tuberculosis, premature births and low birth weight are also suspected of being caused by IAP.

Women and girls 
Women and girls are largely responsible for collecting fuel-wood for cooking in most households, particularly in rural communities and in refugee camps. Women and girls also make up the majority of deaths from household air pollution. Replacing traditional kerosene/firewood stoves with cleaner ethanol stoves in Nigeria has been shown to mitigate adverse pregnancy outcomes from HAP.

Approaches

Early interventions
Unfortunately, finding an affordable solution to address the many effects of IAP – improving combustion, reducing smoke exposure, improving safety and reducing labor, reducing fuel costs, and addressing sustainability – is complex and in need of continual improvement. Efforts to improve cook stoves in the past, beginning in the 1950s, were primarily aimed at minimizing deforestation with no concern for IAP, though the effectiveness of these efforts to save firewood is debatable. Various attempts had various outcomes. For example, some improved stove designs in Kenya significantly reduced particulate emissions but produced higher CO2 and SO2 emissions. Flues to remove smoke were difficult to design and were fragile.

Improved success

Current improved interventions however, include smoke hoods which operate in much the same manner as flues, to extract smoke, but are found to reduce levels of IAP more effectively than homes that relied solely on windows for ventilation.
Some features of newly improved stoves include a chimney, enclosing the fire to retain heat, designing a pot holder to maximize heat transfer, dampers to control air flow, a ceramic insert to reduce heat loss, and multi-pot systems to allow for cooking multiple dishes.

Stoves are now known to be one of the least-cost means to achieve the combined objective of reducing the health burden of IAP and in some areas reducing environmental stress from biomass harvesting. Some success in installation of interventions, including improved cook stoves, has been achieved primarily due to an interdisciplinary approach which includes multiple stakeholders. These projects have discovered that key socio-economic issues must be addressed to ensure the success of intervention programs. A multitude of complex issues indicate improved stoves are not merely a tool to save fuel.

Sustainable energy options 

Large-scale combustion of biomass is only feasible if carried out in a sustainable manner. The concern is paramount for regeneration of renewable and sustainable fuel-wood sources if it is to continue to be available long-term. Attempts at sustainable solutions in Kenya could include developing energy crops (trees and shrubs) which would also provide additional income for farmers. This solution would benefit cropland or rangeland prone to erosion and flooding as the root systems and leaf litter would enhance soil stability. Careful selection of regenerating varieties would be most sustainable because soil stability is not disrupted due to tilling and planting. Some people view this solution as a way to further exploit forests, but with proper management of forest resources this could be a viable solution.

Fuels and cook stove technology can be assessed on two factors: energy efficiency and emissions in the household. High-performing efficient stoves can improve environmental outcomes to an extent even with unclean fuels (such as firewood and biomass). According to a study comparing environmental, social, and economic life cycle impacts of cooking fuels, with more efficient stoves "more of the heating value of the fuel is converted into useful cooking energy and therefore less fuel must be produced, transported, and burned to deliver the same amount of cooking".

Other sustainable options include liquid and gas fuels that are combusted in high-performing efficient stoves. For instance, ethanol produced from cellulosic/non-food feedstocks (wood, agricultural residue) has lower environmental life cycle impacts compared to ethanol produced from sugar and starch materials. LPG, though made from non-renewable fossil fuels, still has lower negative health impacts than traditional fuels – thus even though it is not a sustainable alternative, it creates far less emissions impacts than traditional fuels.

Challenges

Supply
There exist trade-offs between efficiency and sustainability on the supply side of the cook stoves and fuels market. While developing cook stoves that use efficient and clean fuel sources is environmentally ideal, often this is not a viable solution due to barriers to scaling up production and consumption of these fuels. For instance, electric stoves are cited as emission-free 'clean' alternatives to biomass at the household level. 
 However, negative externalities still exist – ambient air pollution in areas near power plants still poses a health risk, while the generation of electricity in India and China (countries largely dependent on coal for electricity generation) still poses significant environmental risks. Moreover, only households that are connected to the electric grid in a country or region will have access to electricity for household energy consumption, thereby excluding a large swathe of rural communities.

Demand
On the demand side, challenges exist in terms of creating an enabling environment for cook stove acquisition. Incorporating culturally sensitive behavior change techniques (BCTs) into demand interventions is necessary to foster large-scale behavior change, as discussed below. The other prohibitive aspect of cook stove interventions that do not involve paternalistic good provision is the high up-front costs of improved stoves. Consumers at the bottom of the income pyramid are often the target end-users of these improved technologies, but due to a lack of collateral or isolation, they do not have access to traditional forms of consumer finance and credit. Innovations in business models and the increased proliferation of microfinance institutions (MFIs) are addressing these issues – however, MFIs face challenges of scaling up.

Government intervention
Given the negative externalities associated with unclean cook stove technology – the negative impact on women and girls; lack of environmental sustainability; and increased risk of diseases associated with HAP – there is a strong case for government intervention. For instance, one form of intervention could be direct subsidies linked to health and climate impacts – for example, targeted subsidies carbon markets. The provision of public goods such as consumer education, access to consumer finance would also be beneficial interventions. Subsidies towards investment in R&D for cleaner technologies and fuels, as well as for the implementation of a baseline standards and testing framework for cleanliness and efficiency (also provision of a public good), is necessary to create an effective and sustainable supply chain.

Developments for improved cookstoves

There have been significant developments in energy efficient cooking solutions (improved cookstoves), such as the Wonderbag, which can also significantly reduce fuel requirements for residential cooking. Improvements in technology have allowed for the use of more sustainable cooking solutions with traditional fuels, such as the BioLite Home Stove, a biomass stove which reduces fuel consumption by 50% and emissions by up to 95%. Innovations in business models have also allowed for cook stove suppliers to "dramatically improve both manufacturer and end-user economics, while achieving high levels of health and environmental benefits". For instance, Inyeneri is a for-profit energy company in Rwanda that operates as more as a 'cooking fuel utility company'. Its model successfully addresses a number of problems with stove adoption including prohibitively high upfront stove costs, consumer tendency to combine new and old cooking solutions, and lack of commercial viability of these enterprises. 
Additionally, innovations in mobile technology have allowed companies like PayGo Energy in Kenya and KopaGas in Tanzania to overcome the cost barrier that low-income consumers face, including the high up-front cost of stoves and the inaccessibility of purchasing fuels in small quantities (a form of the poverty penalty). MFIs have also begun to turn their attention to clean energy access, as seen with the success of the USAID-funded Renewable Energy Microfinance and Microenterprise Program (REMMP).

National and international effort must be stepped up to advance short and long-term solutions for the millions of women and children who suffer from poverty and disease as a result of indoor air pollution. Scientists predict the African continent will be the first to experience the effects of global warming where widespread poverty will put millions at further risk due to their limited capabilities to adapt. The potential is great for a more sustainable Africa with commitment from within and outside the region. Pneumonia is the number one killer of children in the world and indoor air pollution is a strongly significant risk factor for severe pneumonia. The global health community designated 2 November to be World Pneumonia Day in order to raise awareness about the disease and its causes.

Education interventions and behaviour change techniques
Educational intervention can contribute to reducing exposure to smoke by implementing behaviour change techniques that people to the dangers and encourage a willingness to alter living and cultural practices which could have a significant impact on mitigating exposure to IAP. Behaviour change is one aspect of influencing demand that can be achieved through targeted social marketing campaigns, which are usually of two types: either mass-market campaigns or focused approaches at the local and household level that employ demonstrations and follow up visits. Studies show that mass marketing campaigns do in fact increase awareness of risks of household air pollution, but are often unsuccessful in raising purchases of improved stoves.

Design of these interventions must be undertaken with the knowledge that "consumer needs and preferences are complex and are influenced by many contextual and social factors that require a deep understanding of culture, going beyond technology and economics". These factors include intra-gender issues, felt needs, cultural significance of food, and religious and cultural beliefs. Evidence of one successful government intervention was revealed by China who, between 1980 and 1995, disseminated 172 million improved cookstoves. This effort proved more successful due to the inclusion of local users, particularly women, who were involved in the design and fieldwork process.

Primary intervention for children
Children up to five years of age spend 90% of their time at home. Globally, 50% of pneumonia deaths among children under five years of age are due to particulate matter inhaled from indoor air pollution. Many homes around the world used solid fuels for cooking. These fuels release large amounts of carbon monoxide and fine particulate matter. These chemical irritants when inhaled may cause different pulmonary conditions ranging from pulmonary epithelial cancer or acute pulmonary tract infection.

Country examples

Kenya 

As of 2004, Kenya has shown a willingness to undertake biomass energy issues with the understanding that consumption is associated with indoor air pollution and environmental degradation. Suggestions from the United Nations Development Programme include establishing an institution that will deal exclusively with biomass energy by developing policy guidelines on sustainable firewood, charcoal, and modern biomass such as cleaner fuels and wind, solar, and small scale hydropower. Short-term solutions rest in more efficient domestic energy use by way of improved cook stoves which provide more affordable options in the near future than a complete shift to nonsolid fuels. Long-term solutions rest on transition to modern cleaner fuels and alternative energy sources within a broad international and national policy and economic agenda. Government support for long-term solutions is feasible as witnessed by current efforts in Zambia to develop policy to promote biofuels.

Kenya is the world leader in the number of solar power systems installed per capita (but not the number of watts added). More than 30,000 small solar panels, each producing 12 to 30 watts, are sold in Kenya
annually. For an investment of as little as $100 for the panel and wiring, the PV system can be used to charge a car battery, which can then provide power to run a fluorescent lamp or a small television for a few hours a day. More Kenyans adopt solar power every year than make connections to the country's electric grid.

The following information represents one successful intervention known as the Kenya Smoke and Health Project (1998–2001) which involved fifty rural households in two separate regions, Kajiado and West Kenya. These areas were chosen due to different climate, geographic, and cultural implications. Community participation was the primary focus for this project and as a result, those involved indicated the results far exceeded their expectations. Local women's groups and, in the case of the project in West Kenya, men were actively involved. By involving the end-users the project resulted in more widespread acceptance and created the further benefit of providing local income.

Three key interventions were discussed and disseminated; ventilation by enlarging windows or opening eaves spaces, adding smoke hoods over the cooking area, or the option of installing an improved cook stove such as the Upesi stove. Smoke hoods are free-standing units that act like flues or chimneys in their effort to draw smoke out of the dwelling. They can be used over traditional open fires and this study showed they contribute to considerably lower levels of IAP. The smoke hood models were made with hard manila paper and then transferred to heavy-gauge galvanized sheet metal and manufactured locally. This resulted in further employment opportunities for the artisans who were trained by the project. The Upesi stove, made of clay and kiln-fired, was developed by Practical Action and East African partners to utilize wood and agricultural wastes. Because this stove was designed and adapted for local needs it produced several winning features. Not only does it cut the use of fuel-wood by approximately half, and reduce exposure to household smoke, it also empowers local women by creating employment as they are the ones who make and market the stoves. These women's groups gain access to technical training in production and marketing and enjoy higher wage earnings and improved social status as a result of the introduction of this improved stove.

Various benefits were realized including improved health; the most important aspect to each of the villagers involved. The people reported less internal heat allowing for better sleep, fewer headaches and less fatigue, less eye irritation and coughs and dizziness. Safety increased due to the smoke hoods preventing goats and children from falling into the fire and less soot contamination was observed, along with snakes and rodents not entering the home. Windows allowed for the ability to view cattle from indoors, and also reduced kerosene needs due to improved interior lighting. Overall, the indoor environment improved greatly from various simple things that are taken for granted in modern western homes. Greater indoor light also allows for more income generation for women as they can do beadwork by the window when weather doesn't allow for this work outdoors. Children also benefit from increased lighting for homework.

Interpersonal relationships developed among the women due to the project, and men better supported their wives initiative when the result benefited them as well. While initial efforts to improve stoves were limited in success, current efforts are more successful due to the recognition that sustainable domestic energy resources are "central to reducing poverty and hunger, improving health…and improving the lives of women and children" The optimal short-term goal in minimizing rural poverty is to provide inexpensive and acceptable solutions to the local people. Not only can stoves contribute to this intervention, but the use of cleaner fuels will also provide further benefits.

Guatemala 
Similar improved-stove projects have proven successful in other regions of the world. Improved stoves installed as part of the Randomized Exposure Study of Pollution Indoors and Respiratory Effects (RESPIRE) study in Guatemala were found to be acceptable to the population and produce significant health benefits for both mothers and children. Mothers in the intervention group had lower blood pressure and reductions in eye discomfort and back pain. Intervention households were also found to have lower levels of small particles and carbon monoxide. Children in these households also had lower rates of asthma. This initial pilot program has evolved into CRECER (Chronic Respiratory Effects of Early Childhood Exposure to Respirable Particulate Matter), which will attempt to follow children in intervention households for a longer period of time to determine whether the improved stoves also contribute to greater health over the lifespan.

India 
The National Program on Improved Chulhas in India has also had some success in encouraging the use of improved stoves among at-risk populations. Begun in the mid-1980s, this program provides subsidies to encourage families to purchase the longer-lasting chulhas and have a chimney installed. A 2005 study showed that stoves with chimneys are associated with a lower incidence of cataracts in women. Much of the available information from India is more of a characterization of the issue and there is less data available from intervention trials.

China 
China has been particularly successful at encouraging the use of improved stoves, with hundreds of millions of stoves installed since the beginning of the project in the early 1980s. The government very intentionally targeted poorer, rural households, and by the late 1990s nearly 75% of such households contained "improved kitchens." A 2007 review of 3500 households showed an improvement in indoor air quality in intervention households characterized by lower concentrations of small particles and carbon monoxide in household air. The program in China involved intervention on a large scale, but the cost of stoves was heavily subsidized so it is not known if its success could be replicated.

See also

 Energy poverty and cooking
Envirofit
 Guatemala Stove Project
 Rocket stove
 Rural electrification
 Sick building syndrome
 Renewable energy in China

References

External links
 World Health Organization Page on Indoor Air Pollution
 Washington Post Article on Indoor Air Pollution in Asia
 IPS story on the Cost of IAP to Women's Health
 Practical Action
 2 November is World Pneumonia Day
 Air Pollution and Hair Loss

Building biology
International development
Air pollution